María de los Ángeles Dávila Bolaños (born 22 December 1996), known as Ángela Dávila, is a Guatemalan footballer who plays as a midfielder for Comunicaciones FC and the Guatemala women's national team.

Club career
Dávila has played in her country for Comunicaciones FC.

International career
Dávila capped for Guatemala at senior level during the 2020 CONCACAF Women's Olympic Qualifying Championship qualification.

References

1996 births
Living people
Guatemalan women's footballers
Women's association football midfielders
Guatemala women's international footballers